The Times Square Building, formerly the Times Building, is a registered landmark building in Seattle, Washington. It was completed in 1916 and housed editorial operations of the Seattle Times newspaper, which was housed there until 1930. Located at 414 Olive Way, it is entirely surrounded by streets: 4th Avenue, Olive Way, Stewart Street and 5th Avenue. The building has a Beaux-Arts design and flatiron shape. It is five stories high.

Designed by the Seattle architects Bebb and Gould, the Times Square building was listed on the National Register of Historic Places in 1983 and was designated a city landmark in 1984.

References
Notes

Further reading
 Vance Corporation data sheet
 Seattle Post-Intelligencer article praising the structure
 Phorio datasheet

External links

 View ca. 1930

Newspaper headquarters in the United States
Newspaper buildings
Beaux-Arts architecture in Washington (state)
1910s architecture in the United States
National Register of Historic Places in Seattle
Office buildings in Seattle
Office buildings on the National Register of Historic Places in Washington (state)
Downtown Seattle